Abigail Harrison (born 7 December 1997) is a Scottish footballer who plays as a  forward for Bristol City and the Scotland national team.

Club career

Scotland
Raised in the south of Glasgow where she attended Holyrood Secondary School, Harrison began her career with Celtic, making her debut aged 14 – the youngest player to appear in the Scottish Women's Premier League – before joining Hibernian in 2015.

Having already been in the team which won the Scottish Women's Cup in 2016, she scored the opening goal of the 2017 final as Hibernian defeated Glasgow City 3–0, and scored twice in the 2018 final, an 8–0 victory over Motherwell, although substituted through injury in the first half. Harrison also won three SWPL Cups (2016, 2017 and 2018) during her four-year spell with the Edinburgh club, but they finished runners-up behind Glasgow City in the league each season. She was the division's top goalscorer and Golden Boot winner in both 2017 (15 goals) and 2018 (25 goals).

England
Harrison signed for FA Women's Super League club Bristol City in January 2019. 
In November 2019 she suffered an anterior cruciate ligament injury, which ruled her out for at least the rest of the 2019–20 FA WSL season. She became available for selection again in August 2020, and was an unused substitute in the 2021 FA Women's League Cup Final (a defeat by Chelsea) in March 2021.

International career
Born in London, Harrison was eligible for Scotland, England or Jamaica due to her heritage.

She was called up to the full Scotland squad for the first time in September 2016, and made her full international debut in a friendly match against Russia in January 2018. She has also represented Scotland at Under-16, Under-17 and Under-19 level.

On her competitive debut for Scotland, against Ukraine in November 2021 in a 2023 FIFA Women's World Cup qualification – UEFA Group B fixture, Harrison scored a last minute equaliser with a header as the match ended 1–1.

Notes

References

Living people
1997 births
Hibernian W.F.C. players
Scottish Women's Premier League players
Scottish women's footballers
Footballers from Glasgow
Celtic F.C. Women players
Scotland women's international footballers
Women's association football forwards
Bristol City W.F.C. players
Women's Super League players
Black British sportswomen
Scottish people of English descent
Scottish people of Jamaican descent
British sportspeople of Jamaican descent
People educated at Holyrood Secondary School